Kokoda Airport is an airport in Kokoda, Papua New Guinea. The airfield was a focal point of the intense battle along the famous Kokoda trail, during the second World War. It was taken and retaken several times by both Japanese and Australian troops, every time with heavy casualties.

Incidents and accidents
On 11 August 2009, Airlines PNG Flight 4684, a de Havilland Canada DHC-6 Twin Otter carrying 11 passengers and 2 crew, flying from Port Moresby, crashed into a mountain at Isurava, Papua New Guinea whilst attempting a go around. All passengers and crew perished in the accident.

References

Airports in Papua New Guinea
Oro Province
Kokoda